Behaimia cubensis is a species of legume in the family Fabaceae. It is found only in Cuba.

References

Brongniartieae
Flora of Cuba
Endangered plants
Taxonomy articles created by Polbot